Kottmar is a mountain of Saxony, southeastern Germany. It is part of the Lusatian Highlands (Lausitzer Bergland). Its elevation is 583 m.

External links 

Mountains of Saxony
Lusatian Highlands
Görlitz (district)